Badnjevac may refer to:

 Badnjevac, Batočina, a village in Batočina, Serbia
 Badnjevac, Žitorađa, a village in Žitorađa, Serbia
 FK Badnjevac, a football club in Badnjevac, a village near Batočina, Serbia